Semantoridae is an extinct family of stem-pinnipeds with fossils found in France, Kazakhstan, and Canada, dating back to various points in time in the Miocene epoch. Based on their overall anatomy semantorids were not marine specialists, as their elongated bodies, a long tail and robust limbs suggest they were freshwater animals not unlike otters. Indeed, at least some taxa such as Semantor and Potamotherium were initially classified as mustelids closely related to otters.

References

Miocene pinnipeds
Transitional fossils
Prehistoric mammal families